Frank Lima  (1939 in Spanish Harlem, New York City, New YorkOctober 21, 2013 in Long Island, New York) was an American poet most closely associated with the New York School.

Education
Lima received his MFA from Columbia University where he studied under among others Kenneth Koch and Stanley Kunitz. His published volumes of verse include; Inventory (1964), Underground with the Oriole (1971 E.P. Dutton), Angel, New Poems (1976 Liveright Publications), Inventory: New & Selected Poems (1997 Hard Press) and The Beatitudes (2000).

Career as chef
Lima was also a classically trained chef who taught at the New York Restaurant School and was an assistant chef at the White House during the John Fitzgerald Kennedy administration.

Public presence
Lima was depicted in Wynn Chamberlain's noted diptych "Poets Dressed and Undressed", which portrays the quartet of Joe Brainard, Frank O'Hara, Joe LeSueur and Lima in successive panels, clothed and then naked.

Posthumous Publications 

 Incidents of Travel in Poetry: New and Selected Poems (City Lights, 2015)

References

American male poets
1939 births
2013 deaths
American chefs
American male chefs
20th-century American poets
Columbia University School of the Arts alumni
20th-century American male writers
People from East Harlem